MacFarlane may refer to:
 MacFarlane (surname), a surname
 Macfarlane Burnet, Australian virologist
 MacFarlane Lang, a biscuit firm which merged with McVitie & Price to form United Biscuits
 Macfarlane Group, a packaging and label company headquartered in Glasgow, Scotland
Macfarlane, Queensland, a locality in the Blackall-Tambo Region, Australia

See also
 Clan MacFarlane, a Highland Scottish clan
 McFarlane (surname)
 Alexander Macfarlane (disambiguation)
 McFarlane (disambiguation)
 MacFarlan